Anthony Francis Huck (born December 4, 1945 in Regina, Saskatchewan) is a former professional ice hockey player. While Huck played professionally in both the National Hockey League (NHL) and World Hockey Association (WHA), his greatest contributions may have been with the Canada men's national ice hockey team during years before NHL professionals were allowed to compete internationally. His tenure culminated at the 1968 Winter Olympics where he helped the team win the bronze medal. In 1999, Huck was inducted into the IIHF Hall of Fame.

Amateur career
Huck excelled in junior hockey with the Regina Pats. His achievements included winning the scoring title, making the all-star team and being named league MVP. After junior, Huck shocked many hockey by joining the Canadian national team instead of the NHL. At the time the program, run by Father David Bauer, afforded hockey players the alternative of pursuing higher education while still playing hockey. Huck wanted to study law. He was with the national team from 1965 to 1969 winning the bronze medal at the 1968 Olympics and also bronze at the IIHF World Championships in 1966 and 1967.

Professional career
After playing with the national team, Huck began his professional career with the Montreal Canadiens, followed by two seasons with the St. Louis Blues and the Western Hockey League's Denver Spurs. He then moved over to the WHA, joining the Winnipeg Jets and Minnesota Fighting Saints. In all, Huck played three seasons in the NHL and five in the WHA. He retired after the 1977-78 season.

Personal life and post-hockey career
Huck graduated from the University of Manitoba with a law degree in 1970. Today he is a practicing lawyer in British Columbia. He is also senior partner in a firm which specializes in helping former athletes make the transition to life after their sporting career.

Honours and awards
Named to First All-Star Team 1966 and 1968 IIHF World Championships.
Inducted International Ice Hockey Federation Hall of Fame in 1999.
Most valuable player award 1971-72 WHL
Inducted into the Saskatchewan Sports Hall of fame in 2006.

References

External links
 
 Biography in the Regina Leader-Post
 Testimonial from the Saskatchewan Sports Hall of Fall

1945 births
Living people
Canadian expatriate ice hockey players in the United States
Canadian ice hockey centres
Canadian ice hockey coaches
Denver Spurs (WHL) players
Edmonton Oil Kings (WCHL) players
Ice hockey people from Saskatchewan
Ice hockey players at the 1968 Winter Olympics
IIHF Hall of Fame inductees
Minnesota Fighting Saints players
Montreal Canadiens players
Olympic bronze medalists for Canada
Olympic ice hockey players of Canada
Olympic medalists in ice hockey
St. Louis Blues players
Sportspeople from Regina, Saskatchewan
Winnipeg Jets (WHA) players
Winnipeg Warriors coaches